Nesphostylis is a genus of flowering plants in the legume family, Fabaceae. It belongs to the subfamily Faboideae. It was previously believed to be a monotypic African genus consisting of the species N. holosericea from West and East Africa, but a second species, Nesphostylis lanceolata, was found in Burma in 1977. A third species, N. bracteata, was found in India.

References 

Phaseoleae
Fabaceae genera